The Planet of Junior Brown is a 1971 young adult novel by Virginia Hamilton and illustrator Jerry Pinkney. It is about two boys, Junior Brown and Buddy, who with a school janitor, Mr. Pool, construct a mechanical solar system.

Reception
Barbara Bader reviewing The Planet of Junior Brown in Kirkus Reviews wrote "This is not a story to be judged on grounds of probability, but one which makes its own insistent reality; it endures along with its promise long after the story ends." and revisiting the book in Horn Book 40 years later noted that children were not borrowing the book from libraries but wrote "the human drama will prevail and Junior Brown will continue to find susceptible readers, here and there, to whom it will mean a great deal."

The Planet of Junior Brown has also been reviewed by African American Review, and Literature Arts Medicine Database.

Awards and nominations
1972–1973 Mark Twain Awards - nomination
1971 Horn Book fanfare book
1972 Lewis Carroll Shelf Award - winner
1972 Newbery Medal - honor

Adaptations
In 1997 a film of the same name, adapted from the novel was released.

References

1971 American novels
Newbery Honor-winning works
Picture books by Jerry Pinkney
American young adult novels
American novels adapted into films
1971 children's books
Literature by African-American women